Reilly Dolman (born February 29, 1988) is a Canadian actor best known for his main role as Philip Pearson in the Netflix series Travelers. , he lives in Vancouver, British Columbia.

Career
Dolman's interest in acting was sparked during a digital media class in high school.  He began his career in 2007 and has had a steady stream of minor and recurring roles in television series including Bionic Woman, Supernatural, and Stargate Universe and in movies. He landed a main role as Philip Pearson in the Netflix streaming series Travelers in 2016.

Filmography

Film

Television

References

External links

1988 births
Living people
Male actors from Vancouver
Canadian male film actors
Canadian male television actors
21st-century Canadian male actors